The Dunnigan Hills AVA is an American Viticultural Area located in the Dunnigan Hills, in Yolo County, California.  Located in the northwest portion of Yolo County, the wine region has a Mediterranean climate that is less prone to frost than other parts of the Sacramento Valley.  The largest winery in the Dunnigan Hills is R.H. Phillips, which has a  estate vineyard.

References 

Geography of Yolo County, California
American Viticultural Areas of California
American Viticultural Areas
1993 establishments in California